Lana Jo Chapin is an American Paralympic alpine skier. She represented the United States in Para-alpine skiing at the 1984 and 1988 Winter Paralympics. She won three medals, including two silver and a bronze.

Career 
At the 1984 Winter Paralympics, Chapin finished third, winning the bronze medal in the LW4 downhill race, with a time of 1:19.76,. On the podium, in 1st place, the German Reinhild Möller (in 1: 13.01) and in 2nd place the Canadian Lana Spreeman (in 1: 17.97).

At the 1988 Winter Paralympics, in Innsbruck, Chapin won two silver medals: in the giant slalom ( gold medal for Reinhild Möller and bronze for Beatrice Berthet ),  and downhill (in 1st place Möller and in 3rd place Lana Spreeman). Both races took place in the LW4 category.

References 

Living people
Paralympic alpine skiers of the United States
American female alpine skiers
Alpine skiers at the 1984 Winter Paralympics
Alpine skiers at the 1988 Winter Paralympics
Medalists at the 1984 Winter Paralympics
Medalists at the 1988 Winter Paralympics
Paralympic silver medalists for the United States
Paralympic bronze medalists for the United States
Date of birth missing (living people)
Place of birth missing (living people)